Galleh Dar (also Romanized as Galleh Dār and Galehdār; also known as Gilehdār and Kaleh Dār) is a city and capital of Galleh Dar District, in Mohr County, Fars Province, Iran.  At the 2006 census, its population was 9,982, in 1,995 families.

According to a 1939 publication of the anthropologist Henry Field, 4,500 Circassians lived in Gilehdar.

References

Populated places in Mohr County

Cities in Fars Province